Víctor Manuel González Reynoso (born September 10, 1973 in 
Querétaro) is a Mexican actor. He is the nephew of the well-known composer Oscar Reynoso.

Filmography
 El Conde: Amor y honor (2023) as Ricardo Sánchez
 Los ricos también lloran (2022) as León Alfaro
 Quererlo todo (2020-2021) as Leonel Montes 
 Soltero con hijas (2019-2020) as Antonio Paz 
 Muy padres (2017-2018) as Emilio Palacios Fernández
 La candidata (2016-2017) Gerardo Martinez
 Hombre tenías que ser (2013) as Román Ortega/Román Lara Martí
 La Mujer de Judas  (2012) as Salomon Salvatierra
 Entre el Amor y el Deseo (2010) as Luis Carlos Marquez
 Pasión Morena (2009) as Leo Hernandez/Fernando Sirenio
 Alma Indomable (2008) as Nicanor Sanchez
 Bajo las riendas del amor (2007) as Victor
 Tropico (2007) as Antonio Guzman
 El Amor No Tiene Precio (2005) as Marcelo Carvajal
 Amor descarado (2003) as Ignacio Valdez
 La duda (2002) as Julian
 El Pais de las Mujeres (2002) as Daniel Cano
 Lo que es el amor (2001) as Pablo Rivas
 El amor no es como lo pintan (2000) as Alberto Miranda
 El precio de nuestra sangre (2000)
 Besos prohibidos (1999) as Carlos
 Marea brava (1999) as Paulo
 Azul Tequila (1998) as Arcadio Berriozabal
 Perla (1998) as Hugo
 Mirada de mujer (1997) as Fernando
 Pueblo chico, infierno grande (1997) as Raul

External links
 Victor Gonzalez Official Website Sitio  Oficial
 

1973 births
Living people
Mexican male film actors
Mexican male telenovela actors
Mexican male television actors
People from Querétaro City
Male actors from Querétaro
People educated at Centro de Estudios y Formación Actoral